He Zhihong 何炙鴻 (born March 20, 1970) is a Chinese-French illustrator of children's books.

She was born in China and started to paint as a child with her father, who was a painter. She graduated from Beijing Academy of Fine Arts, where she studied traditional Chinese painting. She paints on both silk and rice paper. He Zhihong now lives in Paris and has several books published in France. Contes des peuples de Chine received the Nuit du Livre award for the best children’s book.

List of works
 Contes de Chine : L'origine des grandes fêtes, Seuil Jeunesse, 2014
 Que fais-tu bébé ?, Seuil Jeunesse, 2014
 Voilà le loup, Chan Ok, 2013
 Nian le terrible, Seuil Jeunesse, 2012
 Mes images de Chine, Seuil Jeunesse, 2011
 (with Guillaume Olive) My First Book of Chinese Calligraphy, Tuttle Publishing, 2010
 La Grande Muraille de Chine, Casterman, 2009
 Poèmes de Chine, Seuil, 2009
 La fille du pays des neiges, Sorbier, 2007
 Pourquoi le tigre ne grimpe pas aux arbres, Seuil Jeunesse, 2007
 J’apprends la calligraphie chinoise, Picquier Jeunesse, 2006
 Le cerf-volant dans l’arbre, Picquier Jeunesse, 2006
 La forêt des pandas, Seuil Jeunesse, 2006 (Prix Saint-Exupéry)
 Long-long’s New Year, Frances Lincoln, 2005 (Peter Pan Prize)
 Lili et le rêve du papillon, Bleu de Chine, 2005
 Lili et le goût de la Chine, Bleu de Chine, 2004
 Le mariage de Souricette, Syros Jeunesse, 2004
 Ma vie à Pékin au fil des mois, Syros Jeunesse, 2003
 Contes des peuples de Chine, Syros Jeunesse, 2003 (Prix de la Nuit du Livre)
 Contes de Mandchourie : Le fleuve du dragon noir, L’école des loisirs, 2003
 Le daim mangeur de tigre, L’école des loisirs, 2002

References

External links 

 He Zhihong at ricochet-jeunes.org

Living people
1970 births
20th-century Chinese women artists
21st-century Chinese women artists
Chinese children's book illustrators